Aberdare is a suburb of Cessnock, a large town based on coal mining in the Lower Hunter Region, New South Wales, Australia. Aberdare is a small suburb  just 15 minutes’ from beautiful wine country, 45 minutes to Newcastle and two hours to Sydney. George Brown found coal in the area in 1800's. Coal mining created the land boom of 1903-23 and by 1926 Cessnock had a population of 12,000 within a one-mile radius

Heritage Listing 
Aberdare Central Colliery Company Houses on 33,37, 41-47 Cessnock Street.

References 

Suburbs of City of Cessnock
Towns in the Hunter Region